Dalcerides nana is a moth in the family Dalceridae. It was described by Paul Dognin in 1920. It is found in southern Brazil. The habitat consists of subtropical wet and subtropical moist forests.

References

Moths described in 1920
Dalceridae
Moths of South America